Bärbel Broschat ( Klepp, born 2 November 1957 in Magdeburg) is a retired East German 400 metres hurdler.

Biography
In 1980, a special edition of the World Championships was staged in Sittard, holding events not yet on the Olympic programme. Broschat won the 400 m hurdles ahead of compatriots Ellen Neumann and Petra Pfaff. Her winning time of 54.55 seconds was a career best time. This ranks her tenth among German 400 m hurdlers, behind Sabine Busch, Cornelia Ullrich, Ellen Fiedler, Heike Meißner, Gudrun Abt, Silvia Rieger, Susanne Losch, Karin Roßley and Petra Krug.

Broschat represented the sports club SC Magdeburg, and became East German champion in 1979.

Broschat is 1.73 metres tall; during her active career she weighed 62 kg.

References 

1957 births
Living people
East German female hurdlers
Sportspeople from Magdeburg
World Athletics Championships medalists
World Athletics Championships winners